Phyllis Logan (born 11 January 1956) is a Scottish actress, known for playing Lady Jane Felsham in Lovejoy (1986–1993) and Mrs Hughes (later Carson) in Downton Abbey (2010–2015). She won the BAFTA Award for Most Promising Newcomer for the 1983 film Another Time, Another Place. Her other film appearances include Secrets & Lies (1996), Shooting Fish (1997), Downton Abbey (2019) and Misbehaviour (2020).

Early life
Logan's father, David, was a Rolls-Royce engineer and a trade-union leader and became the secretary of his local branch of the AUEW (Amalgamated Union of Engineering Workers). Phyllis is the youngest in her family and has a brother and a sister. Her father died at the age of 59 while she was at drama school.

Education
Logan was born in Paisley, Renfrewshire, and grew up in nearby Johnstone, where she was educated at Johnstone High School. She studied at the Royal Scottish Academy of Music and Drama in Glasgow and graduated with the James Bridie gold medal in 1977.

Career
After graduation Logan joined the Dundee Repertory Theatre. She left in 1979 to work on stage in Edinburgh. She also worked regularly on Scottish television. On the BBC Scotland production, The White Bird Passes, she first met writer-director Michael Radford. For his first feature film, Another Time, Another Place (1983), he cast Logan in the leading role of Janie, for which she won a Gold Award for Best Actress at the Taormina Film Festival and the Evening Standard Award for Best Actress in 1983 and the BAFTA Award for Most Promising Newcomer to Leading Film Roles in 1984. She was also nominated for the BAFTA Award for Best Actress in a Leading Role. 

Before her success in Downton Abbey, where she played the housekeeper Mrs Hughes, Logan was most identified with the role of Lady Jane Felsham, co-starring with Ian McShane for eight years in nearly 50 episodes of Lovejoy, a comedy-drama for television.

Her character in Downton Abbey, Mrs Hughes, was voted the best Downton Abbey character of all times in a poll conducted by RadioTimes.com (the official website of Radio Times). 

She also starred in the 1996 Mike Leigh film Secrets & Lies alongside Timothy Spall and Brenda Blethyn. Logan provided the broadcast voice of Ingsoc in a film version of Nineteen Eighty-Four (1984) and the Loch Ness Monster (Nessie) in the animated film Freddie as F.R.O.7 (1992). She was in the radio series Coming Alive and Baggage. She played Inspector Frost's love interest and eventual wife in If Dogs Run Free, the last story in the A Touch of Frost series.

She played Maggie Smart in The Good Karma Hospital (7 episodes, 2017–2018) on the ITV drama  series which was later made available on Acorn TV. She also starred in a main role as Linda Hutchinson in the ITV drama series Girlfriends which was created and directed by Kay Mellor, alongside Miranda Richardson and Zoë Wanamaker.

She played Andinio in "The Battle of Ranskoor Av Kolos", the tenth episode in the eleventh series of Doctor Who.

She was cast in the second series of the British television series Guilt, which was shown on both BBC Two and BBC Scotland in 2021.

Personal life
Logan married actor Kevin McNally, whom she met in the 1994 mini-series Love and Reason, and has one child. They live in Chiswick.

She supports several charities that support the welfare of dementia patients and is also a supporter of SSPCA.

Filmography

Film
{| class="wikitable sortable"
|-
! Year
! Title
! Role
! Notes
|-
|1983
|Another Time, Another Place
|Janie
|BAFTA Award for Most Promising Newcomer to Leading Film RolesEvening Standard British Film Award for Best ActressRimini Film Festival Award for Best ActressTaormina Film Fest Golden Mask AwardNominated— BAFTA Award for Best Actress in a Leading RoleNominated— David di Donatello for Best Foreign Actress
|-
|1983
|Every Picture Tells a Story
|Agnes Scott
|
|-
|1984
|
|Alison
|
|-
|1984
|Nineteen Eighty-Four
|Telescreen Announcer
|Voice
|-
|1984
|
|Julia
|Short Film
|-
|1985
|
|Elizabeth Rock
|
|-
|1987
|
|Claudia Procula
|
|-
|1987
|
|Janet Graham
|
|-
|1989
|
|Mary Welsh
|
|-
|1989
|
|Mary Penrys Jones
|
|-
|1990
|
|Camilla Staffa
|
|-
|1992
|Freddie as F.R.O.7.
|Nessie (voice)
|
|-
|1992
|Soft Top Hard Shoulder
|Karla
|
|-
|1993
|Silent Cries / Guests of the Emperor
|Nancy Muir
|
|-
|1993
|Franz Kafka's It's a Wonderful Life
|Frau Brunofsky
|Short Film
|-
|1996
|Secrets & Lies
|Monica Purley
|
|-
|1997
|Shooting Fish
|Mrs. Ross
|
|-
|2003
|Crust
|Bill's Girlfriend
|
|-
|2004
|Cheap Rate Gravity
|Elsie
|Short Film
|-
|2004
|Out of the Shadows
|Liz
|Short Film
|-
|2008
|
|
|Short Film
|-
|2009
|Nativity!
|Mrs. Lore
|
|-
|2012
|Day of the Flowers
|Brenda
|
|-
|2013
|Buoy 
|
|Short Film
|-
|2019
|Downton Abbey
|Elsie Hughes-Carson
|
|-
|2020
|Misbehaviour
|Evelyn Alexander
|
|-
|2020
|You Really Got Me
|Older Linda
|Short Film
|-
|2021
|The Last Bus
|Mary
|
|-
|2021
|Last Train to Christmas
| Auntie Vi
|
|-
|2022
|Downton Abbey: A New Era
|Elsie Hughes-Carson
|
|-
|2022
|Rocketry: The Nambi Effect
|Mrs. Cleaver
|
|-
|2022
|Harold & Mary
|Mary
|Short Film
|-
|To be released
|Banking on Mr. Toad
|Constance Smedley
|Pre-production
|-
|To be released
|Surprised by Oxford|Provost Regina Knight
|Filming
|-
|To be released
|No Way Up|
|Post-Production
|}

Television

Radio appearancesBaggage as FionaComing Alive on BBC Radio 4BBC Radio Shakespeare: Macbeth (Dramatised) on BBC Radio 3 as Lady MacbethR.L. Stevenson's Weir Of Hermiston on BBC Radio 4 as KirstieClassic BBC Radio Horror: Dracula on BBC Radio 4Dr Finlay: Adventures of a Black Bag' on BBC Radio 4

Selected stage roles

Awards and nominations

References

External links

1956 births
Living people
Actresses from Paisley, Renfrewshire
Alumni of the Royal Conservatoire of Scotland
BAFTA Most Promising Newcomer to Leading Film Roles winners
Scottish film actresses
Scottish television actresses
Place of birth missing (living people)
20th-century British actresses
21st-century British actresses
People from Johnstone
Scottish radio actresses